The Mystery of the Yellow Room (French: Le mystère de la chambre jaune) is a 1930 French mystery film directed by Marcel L'Herbier and starring Roland Toutain, Huguette Duflos, and Léon Belières. It is based on the 1907 novel of the same title by Gaston Leroux. L'Herbier made a sequel, The Perfume of the Lady in Black, the following year.

The film's sets were designed by the art director Lazare Meerson.

Cast
 Roland Toutain as Joseph Rouletabille 
 Huguette Duflos as Mathilde Stangerson 
 Léon Belières as Sainclair 
 Edmond Van Daële as Robert Darzac 
 Marcel Vibert as Frédéric Larsan 
 Maxime Desjardins as Professeur Stangerson 
 Pierre Juvenet as Le juge 
 Henri Kerny as Père Jacques 
 Charles Redgie as Le garde-chasse 
 Kissa Kouprine as Marie 
 Jean Diéner as L'avocat 
 Marcel Vallée as Journaliste 
 Duchange as Journaliste 
 Georges Tréville as Le président

References

Bibliography 
 Dayna Oscherwitz & MaryEllen Higgins. The A to Z of French Cinema. Scarecrow Press, 2009.

External links 
 

1930 films
French mystery films
1930 mystery films
1930s French-language films
Films directed by Marcel L'Herbier
French black-and-white films
Films based on French novels
Films based on works by Gaston Leroux
1930s French films